DXMR (99.9 FM), broadcasting as 99.9 Magnum Radyo, is a radio station owned and operated by Hypersonic Broadcasting Center. The station's studio is located at the Magnum Broadcast Center, 2nd floor, SBS Bldg., C.M. Recto Ave., while the transmitter is located along Osmeña St., Cagayan de Oro. Magnum Radyo operates 24 hours a day.

History

1979–2002: 99.9 RK
The station was launched on December 26, 1979, as 99.9 RK with the call letters DXRK. It was formerly owned by P.N. Roa Broadcasting System of then-Mayor Pedro "Oloy" N. Roa. The station carried slogan "The Rhythm of the City" (inherited from 99.5 RT in Manila [now 99.5 Play FM] and Y101 Cebu) and aired a Top 40 (CHR) format.

Originally operating 24 hours a day, on February 3, 1997, it limited its daily broadcast from 8:00 AM to 12:00 MN.

99.9 RK ceased broadcasting on December 31, 2002, after 23 years of broadcasting.

2003–2010: Bay Radio
On January 27, 2003, Baycomms Broadcasting Corporation acquired the station and changed its call letters to DXBD. On February 24, 2003, it was relaunched as 99.9 Bay Radio and carried a mass-based music format. It initially operated from 5:00 AM to 12:00 MN. At that time, its studios and transmitter were located at J.R. Borja St. In 2008, its changed its callsign back to DXRK. On March 2, 2009, Bay Radio began broadcasting 24 hours a day.

After 7 years of broadcasting, 99.9 Bay Radio signed off for the last time on December 25, 2010. During that time, the station was sold to Hypersonic Broadcasting Center, and its studios moved to its present location at the 2nd floor, SBS Building, C.M. Recto Ave., while the transmitter moved to its present location at Osmeña St.

2011–present: Magnum Radyo
On February 28, 2011, after a series of test broadcast, the station was relaunched as Magnum Radyo, with the call letters DXMR, and switched to a "newsic" (news and music) format, similar to 89.5 Brigada News FM in General Santos.

Originally operating daily from 4:00 AM to 12:00 MN, since October 1, 2012, it broadcasts 24 hours a day.

Magnum Radyo has been ranked as the overall #1 FM station in Cagayan de Oro, according to the KBP-Radio Research Council (RRC) Kantar Media Radio Surveys.

References

External links

News and talk radio stations in the Philippines
Radio stations established in 1979
Radio stations in Cagayan de Oro